Calvert Cliffs may refer to:

 Calvert Cliffs Nuclear Power Plant
 Calvert Cliffs State Park